Stamford Bridge is a village and civil parish on the River Derwent in the East Riding of Yorkshire, England, approximately  east of York and  west of Driffield. The village sits astride an ancient ford on the River Derwent.

Stamford Bridge is best known for :

 The  Roman fort Derventio
 The Battle of Stamford Bridge (1066 AD)  " Gefeoht æt Stanfordbrycge " 
 The  York–Beverley railway line (closed in 1965),  railway station and  viaduct 
 The Stamford Bridge road crossing of the River Derwent

Governance
The village lies on the borders with the Ryedale district of North Yorkshire and with the City of York unitary authority. The parish has a parish council, known as Stamford Bridge Parish Council.  It is also within the boundaries of the Pocklington Provincial ward of East Riding of Yorkshire Council, which elects three councillors every four years.

Population
The population has increased in recent years due to substantial new housing developments on the south side of the town.

Name

 Stamford Bridge  ( Stan..ford..brycge ) (1066 AD) 

The site of the Battle of Stamford Bridge was known as  " Stanfordbrycge " 

The name element  ' brycge '  is from Old English  ' brycg '  ( " bridge " ).

Toponym

 Stone ford bridge

History

Roman fort Derventio
The Romans established a fort here about 70 AD, around which later developed a large linear civilian settlement focused on a bridge one mile (1.6 km) south of the present town. 

Iter I of the Antonine Itinerary lists "Derventio" as being seven Roman miles from Eboracum (York) which matches the distance from York. In relation to known discoveries under the town of Malton, antiquaries always assumed that Malton should be called Derventio. The remains at Stamford Bridge were not known to them, lying undiscovered under arable and pasture fields until quite recently.

The name  Derventio  is of Celtic origin (dervo- "oak-tree") and relates to the River Derwent. 
The fort had access to the Roman road network of Roman Britain via the Roman road known as Cade's Road
(Margary road 80a ).
The route of Cade's Road can clearly be seen heading North from Stamford Bridge.

Viking age

The Battle of Stamford Bridge on 25 September 1066 is often wrongly regarded as the traditional end of the Viking era in Britain – this ignores the substantial Norse possessions in Scotland until the aftermath of the Battle of Largs in 1263. At Stamford Bridge King Harold II repelled the invading Norwegian force led by his brother Tostig Godwinson and King Harald Hardrada of Norway, but three weeks later his loss at the Battle of Hastings allowed the Norman Conquest of England.

The settlement was called Pons Belli by the Normans, meaning battle bridge. Rents of freeholders and cottagers were recorded in 1368 and there was a common oven recorded the same year.

Recent history
The A166 east–west road crossing the river at Stamford Bridge is one of the main roads from York to the East Riding and the coast. The road bridge in the village was closed on 5 March 2007, for just over 11 weeks, so that essential repairs could be carried out, in light of the enormous volume of traffic that uses it, exceptional for such an old bridge (dating from 1727). The bridge re-opened on 22 May.

The village suffered from record floods in November 2000 which seriously flooded 30 businesses and homes. Flood defences have now been installed, costing £3.7 million.

The history of Stamford Bridge is covered in British History Online:
Catton Kexby, Scoreby, and Stamford Bridge West, and 
Catton High and Low Catton and Stamford Bridge East.

Natural history

Flooding 
The River Derwent divides Stamford Bridge into two. It rises in the North York Moors and flows south-west rather than taking a direct route to the North Sea. It eventually joins the River Ouse north of the village of Long Drax, before flowing ultimately into the Humber Estuary.

During 4/5 March 1999, exceptional levels of rainfall were experienced in the Derwent catchment area, reaching  inside a 24‑hour period. The situation was worsened by melting snow which had earlier accumulated on the North York Moors.

However, the following year a new record flood level was set. In October 2000 the Derwent again burst its banks and peaked slightly above the 1999 flood level.

Work started in autumn 2003 to build new flood defences for Stamford Bridge and in autumn 2004, work on the defences were finished.

The flood defences were breached, and much of the village square was under water, on the morning of 26 June 2007, in the wake of exceptional rainfall over the previous 24 hours.

Landmarks

Stamford Bridge has several notable landmarks, including the Corn Mill; the stone arched bridge over the River Derwent; the Stamford Bridge Viaduct, and Stamford Bridge railway station, both ; a Wesleyan Methodist Chapel, built 1828 in yellow brick; the Bay Horse Inn, late 18th to early 19th century public house; as well as "Derwent Plastics factory", on the west side of the river, established in 1934 from a former brewery building.

Just east of Stamford Bridge is the manor house Burtonfields Hall, built in 1837 by the architect Anthony Salvin for Charles Darley.  Darley was married to Salvin's sister-in-law Marianne Nesfield, and their daughter married Anthony Salvin Junior. The original house was extended by W H Brierley in about 1898.

A memorial commemorating the Battle of Stamford Bridge overlooking the field where the battle is thought to have taken place is on Whiterose Drive.

The mill

The Cornmill is a late 18th to early 19th century Grade II listed water mill.

The current mill was possibly expanded in 1847–50 when nearly £1,000 was spent on it. Subsequently, there were two water wheels and seven pairs of grinding stones. The mill ceased operation in 1964 and was converted into a restaurant in 1967. More recently the Cornmill was converted into twelve two-bedroom flats but some original equipment remains.

The bridge

There has been a river crossing since at least Roman times. There was a bridge at or near the village in the 11th century as one is referred to in accounts of the battle of 1066, noted in the Anglo-Saxon Chronicle, Manuscript 'C'. Archaeological research has shown that there was a bridge crossing of the River Derwent one mile (1.6 km) south of the present village which linked the east and west bank of the Roman settlement of Derventio.

In the medieval period a new bridge made of timber supported on three stone piers was erected. Records show that this was repaired in the 13th and 16th centuries.

In the 18th century the weir and the by-pass canal and lock, known as the New Cut, were built and the medieval bridge was replaced with the current structure.

The present bridge was designed by William Etty under an Act of 1725 and completed in 1727.
The bridge was strengthened in the 1960s and at the same time the adjacent pedestrian bridge was erected.

The bridge is a Grade II* listed monument.

The viaduct

Opened on 3 October 1847, the viaduct originally carried the York to Beverley railway line across the Derwent, closed 1965. It consists of red brick arches on either side of a single wider wrought-iron span that crosses the river. The viaduct now forms part of a public cycle route, and is Grade II* listed.

Education 

The village school was first built in Main Street in 1795 as a result of a legacy left by Christopher Wharton. Education was provided free for 12 poor boys and 6 poor girls who had to provide one shilling a year for kindling. Pay scholars were also taught and by 1822 the school population numbered 30. 1874 saw compulsory education and in 1911 the East Riding County Council took over and built a school on the present Church Road site.

This original building was modernised and extended in 1968 and because of the rapid development of the village a further extension was added in 1978. In April 1983 a new infants building, in Godwinsway, Stamford Bridge, was added to the school. Built for 120 infant children it makes the school a split site establishment, but adds greatly to the educational provision for the children. In 2000 this building was also extended.

Commerce 
Even though the car journey from York to the North Sea coast takes just an hour, Stamford Bridge remains a popular stopping point for travellers on the A166. Most stops are for refreshment, usually required due to the long queues to get over the one lane bridge, at one of the establishments located around the Square.
The facilities located in central Stamford Bridge include:

Post office and solicitors
Estate agent
Convenience store, a butcher/baker and a pharmacist
Caravan park
Nursing home
Three pubs, the Three Cups, the New Inn (previously known as the Swordsman, but the name was changed back to its original name February 2013) which both provide food and the Bay Horse.
A bistro
A tea room and village shop
An old style sweet shop complete with a Barbers shop in the rear.
Fast food which is served by a pizza/kebab shop, a fish and chip shop, a Chinese restaurant/take-away, Indian restaurant/take-away and a sandwich shop
Modern purpose built veterinary clinic, a dental practice and a doctor's surgery
Two car repair garages
Specialist whisky shop
A shop specialising in eclectic and unusual items.
Hairdressing salon and a beauty/therapy salon.
Florist, which also serves hot drinks.
Funeral director

In recent years Stamford Bridge has lost the services of a petrol filling station (once the village had three), ladies clothing shop, HSBC bank, newsagent, Ice Cream parlour, DIY shop, a cafe and hotel which have all closed.

Other facilities 

The village has several other facilities available for locals and visitors.

Walks – There are well signposted public footpaths along the River Derwent both towards Low Catton (via the Viking Road car park) and Buttercrambe (via the Corn Mill car park). They provide mainly rural picturesque scenery and are unpaved. The route of the White Rose Way, a long-distance walk from Leeds to Scarborough also passes through.
Car parking – Spaces available in the village square and also a large free public car park is located near the A166 road bridge and Viking Road.
Village hall and scout hall – Located on Low Catton Road
Playing Fields Association – Located on Low Catton Road. Home to the cricket club, with tennis and lawn bowls. Also football pitches on the exit to the village further down Low Catton Road
Churches – Methodist church in village square and Church of England located on Church Road
Sports hall – Behind the Old Station Club.
Community First Responder Group – A scheme has been in existence since 2005, supported jointly by the Parish Council and Yorkshire Ambulance Service

Public transport

The village is served by two bus routes. The number 10 route is operated by First York (and York Pullman in the evenings) with a regular service via Dunnington to the centre of York and then Poppleton. East Yorkshire Motor Services operate an occasional service (No 747) between York and Stamford Bridge continuing to Full Sutton, Fangfoss and Pocklington. Information as at October 2011.

Stamford Bridge railway station closed in 1965 as part of the Beeching cuts. The Minsters Rail Campaign is campaigning to re-open the railway line between Beverley and York (with stops at Stamford Bridge, Pocklington and Market Weighton). The proposed re-opened railway would skirt the eastern edge of the village as the former alignment has since been developed.

Notable residents
 Previous home of former England football team's goalkeeper Paul Robinson.
 Birthplace of former Manchester United goalkeeper Nick Culkin.
 Veterinary home of television vet Matt Brash with his newly opened surgery next to the bridge.

References

Notes

Citations

Sources

External links

 "High and Low Catton and Stamford Bridge East", British History Online
 "Derventione", Romanmap.com
 "Temporary Marching Camp – Buttercrambe Moor, nr. Stamford Bridge, North Yorkshire", Roman-Britain.co.uk

Stamford Bridge
Villages in the East Riding of Yorkshire
Civil parishes in the East Riding of Yorkshire